The European Federation of Energy Traders (EFET) is an association of European energy traders in markets for wholesale electricity and gas. EFET was founded in 1999 in response to the liberalisation of electricity and gas markets within the European Union. EFET advocates policies and regulatory measures which allow electricity and gas trading to develop freely while encouraging good risk management practices and responsible corporate governance. In its role as a standard setting body, EFET aims to provide standard solutions to common aspects of wholesale energy transactions, such as contracting and data exchange.

Members 
As of January 2014, EFET had a total of 126 member companies, of which 37 were associate members.

External links 
 EFET website
 EFETnet website

See also
 EurObserv'ER

Notes 

Electric power in Europe
Energy in the European Union
International energy organizations
Commodities traders
European trade associations
Energy law
1999 establishments in Europe
Organizations established in 1999